Southern Altai (also known as Oirot, Oyrot, Altai and Altai proper) is a Turkic language spoken in the Altai Republic, a federal subject of Russia located in Southern Siberia on the border with Mongolia and China. The language has some mutual intelligibility with the Northern Altai language, leading to the two being traditionally considered as a single language. According to modern classifications—at least since the middle of the 20th century—they are considered to be two separate languages. Due to certain similarities with Kyrgyz, it has been grouped as the Kyrgyz–Kipchak subgroup with the Kypchak languages which is within the Turkic language family.

The written Altai is based on Southern Altai. According to some reports, however, it is rejected by Northern Altai children. Dialects include Altai Proper and Talangit.

References

External links
Ethnologue entry for Southern Altai

Turkic languages
Languages of Russia